Ejemekwuru is an Igbo-speaking community that sits in the North-Western part of Imo State in the southeastern region of Nigeria.

Geography, language and demographics 
Ejemekwuru is a community in Oguta Local Government Area of Imo State, in southeastern Nigeria. The people are tribal Igbos, and predominantly speak the Igbo language with a dialect that is close to central Igbo.

Ejemekwuru is situated along the Ogbaku-Oguta road, 15 km from Owerri, 6 km from Ogbaku, and 17 km from Kalabari Beach in Oguta. It is bounded to the west by Agwa, to the east by Ishieke in Azara Obi Ato, to the north by Akabor and Izombe, and to the south by Ogbaku communities. Ejemekwuru is also at the southeastern boundary of Oguta Local Government Area.

The town is approximately 16 sq.km in area with 1/3 of the area currently used for residential living, and the remaining 2/3 of the land area used as agricultural farmland. 
Ejemekwuru was elevated to the status of an Autonomous Community by the Imo State Government, effective January 1996. This elevation was published in the Imo State of Nigeria Extraordinary Gazette, no 2, vol 21 published in April 1996. Prior to this status elevation, the town was a part of the Awa Autonomous Community.

Ejemekwuru is made up of five (5) primary groups of villages. These are Umuagwu, Umuebe, Umuawo, Umuoduwa, and Umuakum. Each group has its own administrative unit, and within each group are smaller villages and kindreds.

Four major roads run north-south, and east-west to connect the community to other parts of Imo State. The North-South bound road also known as the Ogbaku-Oguta road connects Ogbaku to the south of Ejemekwuru to Izombe (and eventually Oguta) to the north of Ejemekwuru. The East-West road is the Azara Obiato-Agwa road connecting Agwa to the west of Ejemekwuru to Azara Obiato to the east of Ejemekwuru.

Along the Ejemekwuru-Ogbaku major road is the community’s major market – Nkwo Ejemekwuru market square. Lying opposite this central market square is the very dense tropical rain forest which doubles as the sacred shrine of the deity Ezeala, hence the name of the forest - Oke Ohia Ezeala. This sacred forest has historical significance for the people of Ejemekwuru. Other smaller regional markets exist in the villages such as the Nkwoala market which now primarily functions as a daily market and sits along the Ejemekwuru-Agwa road in Umuebe village, the now-defunct Eke Eburu market in Umuakum village, and Eke Amadioha market at the intersection of Ogbaku-Oguta road and Agwa-Azara Obiato road.

The climate in Ejemekwuru is the tropical rain forest, with two seasons – the rainy season (udu mmiri) which runs between April and October, and the dry season (okochi) which runs from November through March.

Culture and traditions

Origin 
There are different orally transmitted accounts pointing to the ancestral origin of the people of Ejemekwuru. However, the various accounts point to one individual – Ekwuru as the ancestral patriarch and the head of the ancestral genealogy of the Ejemekwuru people.

According to one account, Ekwuru is said to have arrived from Etekwuru in the regions of Ohaji and Egbema a few millennia ago to inhabit this virgin and pristine fertile land, teeming with wildlife that came to be named after him. There is a counter school of thought that suggests that the reverse was the case i.e. Etekwuru had originated from Ekwuru. Yet another account suggests both Ekwuru and Etekwuru were brothers who both migrated from the Oru area.

The name ‘Ejemekwuru’ metamorphosized from the narrative that Akabo (who was a brother to Ekwuru and the founder of the neighboring Akabo community to the north of Ejemekwuru) would say ‘ejem nga Ekwuru’ meaning ‘I am going to the home of Ekwuru’ whenever he was visiting his brother. ‘Ejem nga Ekwuru’ would later become ‘Ejemekwuru’.

Another account - which is a purely cultural mythology (similar to other cultural myths of the Igbo people) and included in this narrative for completeness, states that a big gourd exploded and released many people, who later became the ancestors of different towns and villages. This account explains that it was from this gourd (Agbugba gbawara mmadu) that Ekwuru came out.

Clearly, not much was recorded or passed down about the father of Ekwuru and that continues to remain a myth.

The present-day people of Ejemekwuru are descendants of 3 brothers – Njioke, Ebechere, and Awo born to the ancestral patriarch, Ekwuru. Njioke, the first son of Ekwuru had 3 sons namely Agwu, Akum, and Oduwa. The groups of villages in Ejemekwuru are direct descendants of these sons of Ekwuru namely:

 Umuagwu, descendants of Agwu
 Umuakum, descendants of Akum
 Umuoduwa, descendants of Oduwa
 Umuebe, descendants of Ebechere
 Umuawo, descendants of Awo

Social system
Before the advent of Christianity, the social life of the people of Ejemekwuru was ordered in accordance with their spiritual beliefs that were rooted in the worship of the Patron deity of the town (Ezeala Ejemekwuru). Oracles and shrines for the Patron deity were erected in the sacred forest (Oke Ohia Ezeala), and worshippers would make sacrifices and offer prayers at these shrines and oracles for protection from evil forces, for a good crop yield after the planting season and for good health, and a good life.

Part of the social norms were societal virtues that were upheld. Some of these included: Truthfulness (Ezi okwu), Non-violence (Igbu ochu), Kindness and Compassion (Obi oma & Idi na otu), Purity and Chastity (Obi ocha). On the other hand, some of the negative attributes and abominable acts were: Ikwa iko (adultery), Izu oshi (thievery), Anya ukwu (avarice or greed), Anya nji (envy). Acts of abomination necessitated purification rites, known as Ikwa Ala.

Days of the week and seasons of the year 
The week has 4 days (Eke, Orie, Afor, Nkwo), and the year has two seasons – the rainy season (udu mmiri) which runs between April and October, and the dry season (okochi) which runs from November through March. The planting season begins after the cold months of January and February, with bush clearing and burning of shrubs (igbu oru), planting of yam, corn, cassava and pumpkin, etc.

Traditional festivals 
Owu, a festival of cultural dance is celebrated after the planting season at the beginning of the rainy season. The first part of the Owu festival is the Igbu awa immediately after the planting season. Following this in the second part Ito nkwa which takes place at the premises of the head of the Owu society (Onye Ishi Owu). Eight days after is the main part of the festival – the owu dance when all and sundry gather for the traditional dance. This dance festival symbolizes a sacred invocation of the spirits of the ancestors to come and dwell with us on earth as masquerades (Okoroshi) for a month-long period of solemnity. Four days after, the masquerades begin to cry at night, and eight days later, they start to spear in the day time.

Only men that are initiated through the igba mmii rites of passage are allowed to join the Okoroshi society. Women and children are excluded and are supposed to be terrified at the approach of the masquerades. The Okoroshi sings and dances in unique and special language peculiar to itself alone.

For sixteen days, except on Nkwo market days, the Okoroshi parades the whole town from dusk to dawn paying visits to elders, and dignitaries and chiefs, who offer gifts of money, wine and food (consumed in secret), while taking the pleasure in pursuing girls, boys and young men who are not members of the Okoroshi society. If unmasked or uninitiated people use the language of the Okoroshi, they are usually subjected to heavy fines called aria Okoroshi. There is the Okoroshi Oma which wears a beautiful face, Okoroshi Ojoo which wears a fearful and ugly face and Ajakaja which is dressed with young palm branches.

In modern times with the advent of Christianity, this festival has lost its spiritual significance and solemnity. It is simply celebrated by the youth these days as a festival of traditional song and dance.

The end of the Okoroshi festival leads to the dawn of the harvesting season, which is celebrated as Iri ji ohuru (new yam festival). During this period full-grown yam tubers, corn, pumpkin, and melon are harvested and enjoyed. Special storage facilities such as barns (obah), and (uko), wooden racks are used to preserve the harvest for later consumption and planting.

In this manner the full year was completed, and the cycle of life went on for this ancient community prior to the advent of modernity with the arrival of colonial masters from Europe.

Other traditional practices 
Other traditional practices included stipulated norms for marriage, funeral, childbirth and naming ceremonies.

In Ejemekwuru’s tradition, male children were circumcised (ibe ugwu) on the 8th day, a tradition that is still practiced to date. In addition, the people practiced ile omugwo when, after a woman had given birth to a child, a very close and experienced relative of her, in most cases her mother was required by tradition to come and spend time with her and her husband, assisting her with household chores, while the new mom focused on breastfeeding the newborn.

The naming ceremony of a newborn child was equally an important cultural event. Names bore meanings and interpretations that were consistent with the circumstances leading to or surrounding the birth of the child. For example, a child born after many years of expectation for a child would be named Ogugua meaning ‘child that has cleaned my tears’. Similarly, a child born after many years of barrenness, if a boy, could be named Amaechi or Obiechina or Ahamefule and a child born during a bumper harvest would be named Obianuju. Other naming conventions included naming children after the name of the market day in which they were born – Nweke, Nworie, Nwafor, and Nwankwo were names given to children born on the respective market days Eke, Orie, Afor and Nkwo.

Chieftaincy (Nze na Ozo) ordination also followed stipulated norms. Before the coming of the British colonial government, the affairs of the town were governed by traditional title holders - Ndi Nze na Ozo, Ndi Nze (also known as Ndi Mgbirichi), and Ndi Ishi Owu (head of the Okoroshi society), as well as elders, who ensured the smooth functioning. These chiefs also meted out punishment (igba aria) to people who defiled the land through misdeeds and acts misconduct.
 
There is also a spirit of brotherly love and unity which the people of Ejemekwuru express through their age-old fondness for addressing each other as nwunnem (literally; my mother’s child), which means brother or sister.

Local economy and primary occupation 
The only economic activity of the indigenes right up to the advent of colonization by Europeans was farming in the form of subsistence farming, animal husbandry and hunting of wildlife. The people grew yams, cassava, maize, melon, and fluted pumpkin. Plantains, bananas, okra, and cocoyams were planted around residential areas. The people practice shifting cultivation i.e. a piece of land is left fallow for a period of five to six years between cultivation. Oil palm trees are found in the wild scattered in the farmlands and these were additional sources of revenue for the people from either the direct sale of the palm heads or the sale of the processed palm oil and palm kernels.

The land is owned communally at the extended family household, and at the beginning of each planting season, the head of each family shares the piece of land available for farming for that given year.

Beyond farming, residents are also into commerce mostly agricultural commodities trading, handcrafts, palm wine taping, and a host of other jobs.

Education and other public amenities 
Ejemekwuru has 3 public elementary schools – namely Community School Ejemekwuru (formerly St. Peters Catholic School), Primary School Ejemekwuru (formerly St. Marks Anglican School), and Town School Ejemekwuru respectively.

There is a secondary school called Ejemekwuru-Akabor Secondary School which was established in 1979. This high school sits at the border with the neighboring town Akabor and was established to serve the needs of Ejemekwuru and Akabor for secondary school education.
  
At the center of the community are situated the Ejemekwuru Post Office – a part of the Nigerian Postal Service System, and the Ejemkwuru Primary Health Center – a public primary healthcare clinic. In addition, there are a number of private primary healthcare providers, notably the Marycare Healthcare Center Ejemekwuru, built, funded, and operated by the US-based NGO, Marycare Inc.

Governance
Since becoming an autonomous community, Ejemekwuru is governed by two arms of administration – the Ezeship Council headed by the traditional ruler (Eze) of the community (who goes by the title EKWURUOMA of EJEMEKWURU), and the Town Union headed by the President of the Town Union.

The Eze is the traditional and cultural head of the community. He is also the chief security officer of the community. Since the elevation to an autonomous community in 1996, the Ejemekwuru community has crowned the following traditional rulers (Ezes):

The late HRH Eze Kevin Ojure-Amadi, Ekwuruoma I of EJEMEKWURU (2007 – 2013)
The late HRH Eze Val Ngozi Nwoke, Ekwuruoma II of EJEMEKWURU (2016 – 2019)

In March 2022, Ezeogo Eze Obinna Hippolyte Duru (Nze n'Ozo, KSJI), Ekwuruoma III of EJEMEKWURU became the third traditional ruler of the Ejemekwuru community.

The Town Union (formerly called Ejemekwuru Progressive Union and now Ejemekwuru Town Union) is the political and administrative arm of the community administration. Together with the heads of the groups of villages, they handle political and administrative issues within the community. Ejemekwuru has seen numerous Town Union Presidents since the inception of the formal Town Union in 1945. Those who have served as Town Union Presidents since inception are: - Joseph Osigwe, Mr. John Odunze Duruji, Chief Festus Ijeoma, Gabriel Ogumerem, Nze Innocent Ihemedu, Nze Cornelius Ogugua, Nze Eugene Ojure-Amadi, Nze P.C. Amako, Nze n'Ozo Obinna Hippolyte Duru, Boniface Ikpeama, Linus Ogumerem, Nze Roland Nwosu, and Uche Nwakuna. The current Town Union President is Chief Keryan Igwebuike.

Tourism and sites 
Ejemekwuru is 15 km from the capital city Owerri and 17 km from Kalabari beach on the shores of the massive Oguta lake. Oguta lake is noted for the presence of the confluence of the blue water from the lake and the muddy water from Orashi River.

Also within Ejemekwuru are the tropical dense forest containing the sacred shrines popularly called Oke Ohia Ezeala. Within this forest are sacred Monkeys which in years back were dedicated to the Ezeala deity (so they can not be hunted or eaten), and by such dedication are naturally preserved and protected (similar to animals in a game reserve). This preserved tropical forest is also home to rich fauna and flora, and a natural haven for biodiversity.

Ejemekwuru is also one of the early oil exploration hubs for the Shell Oil company. A legacy Shell well (never produced) is still present in modern-day Ejemekwuru.

Ejemekwuru in modern times and notable natives 
The Ejemekwuru community has remained relatively peaceful. It is a Christian community that is predominantly Roman Catholics and Anglicans. There are a good number of Pentecostal Christians and an insignificant number of people who still practice the African traditional religion.

During the British colonial era, the first warrant chief appointed for Ejemekwuru was Eze Okwara Uzegbu, a man noted as one with outstanding personality and prominence. He was both a warrant chief and a native court judge. Subsequently, native court judges and local chiefs were appointed at the village level and these included Chief Okwaraozuoha Ubadimma, Chief Onyejigbu Chima, Chief William Amadi, Chief Matthias Nwosu, Chief Olumba Okororie and Chief Peter Amako (who was also a prominent philanthropist).

The last colonial-era warrant chief and native court judge appointed for Ejemekwuru was Chief Festus Ijeoma who was widely viewed as a bold, courageous and fearless judge, and under whose leadership critical infrastructure such as the postal office and health care dispensary were built.

References 

Towns in Imo State